Rice Rhapsody (alternative title Hainan Chicken Rice) (Chinese: 海南雞飯, literally meaning "Hainanese chicken rice") is a 2004 film directed by Kenneth Bi. The cast includes Sylvia Chang and Martin Yan. Jackie Chan was one of the executive producers.

Plot
The film is set in Singapore's Chinatown. It is narrated by Jen Fan, owner of a successful restaurant. Her signature dish is "Chicken Rice"-in fact she is rather well known for it. Jen has three sons. Daniel and Harry are gay, and Jen is determined the youngest, Leo, does not go the same way. She enlists the help of her friend Kim-Chui, who owns a nearby restaurant. He is less successful than Jen, but is in love with her. Leo has become her life, she is pinning all her hopes of grandchildren on him. She and Kim-Chui hatch a plan that involves bringing Sabine, a female French exchange student, to stay at Jen's house.

When Sabine arrives, Leo predictably shows little interest in her. It is painfully clear to all except Jen that Leo is in love with his best friend "Batman". Sabine is very laid- back and mystical in her outlook, and the family warm to her. It is she who ultimately helps Jen come to terms with her life.

When "Batman" suddenly announces that he is leaving Singapore, Jen finally realises the truth from Leo's grief-stricken face, and strikes him in fury. As he leaves the house, she falls down the stairs chasing him, injuring her ankle.

Some time later Jen, persuaded by Sabine, attends Harry's birthday party. There she meets many of Harry's gay friends, and she finds them delightful and fun. Another obstacle she must overcome is news of Daniel's impending gay marriage, she is horrified and cannot accept it. The film ends with Jen finally realising how wonderful her sons truly are. She may also consider a future with the ever-loyal Kim-Chui but this is left open.

Themes

Rice Rhapsody is a comedy with serious themes, including homosexuality and acceptance. The irony is that Jen has three loving, successful sons. Harry, the hairdresser showers her with beauty products. Daniel is a flight attendant. Leo is serious and studious. However, she cannot see beyond her concerns about them being gay. Both Kim-Chui and Sabine eventually help Jen to accept them for what they are, and the film, although comic, strikes a  poignant note as well. An example is the longing expression in Jen's eyes as she gazes at a friend's grandson. Food is also an important theme integral to the plot. Preparation of food, serving of food, are all lovingly portrayed. Sabine the vegetarian never consumes the one thing Jen does best, the "Chicken Rice" of the title. A comic strand involves some friendly competition between Jen and Kim-Chui, (Kim-Chui's speciality is Duck Rice) resulting in a TV cookery standoff that allows Leo to reconcile with her.

Cast and roles
 Sylvia Chang - Jen
 Martin Yan - Kim Chui
 Mélanie Laurent - Sabine
 LePham Tan - Leo
 Andy Mok - Batman
 Craig Toh - Harry
 Alvin Chiang - Daniel
 Maggie Q - Gigi
 Ivy Ling Po - Grandma
 Chin Han - Grandpa (credited as Ronald Bi)
 Samuel Chong - Master of Ceremony
 Steph Song - Jennifer

Awards
 25th Hong Kong Film Awards:
Won: Best New Director (Kenneth Bi)
Nominated: Best Actress (Sylvia Chang)
 Jury Award for Best Actress (Sylvia Chang, 2005 Newport Beach Film Festival)
 Platinum Award for Best First Feature (Kenneth Bi, 2005 Worldfest Houston)
 Top Ten Chinese Language Films of 2005 (Chinese Film Critics Association)
 Outstanding Screenplay (Kenneth Bi, Taiwan Government Information Office)

References

External links
Official website

2004 films
2004 comedy films
Hong Kong LGBT-related films
Singaporean LGBT-related films
Cantonese-language films
2000s Mandarin-language films
Films directed by Kenneth Bi
2000s English-language films
2000s Hong Kong films